Club Veracruzano de Fútbol Tiburón is a Mexican professional football team based in Veracruz City, Mexico currently playing in Liga de Balompié Mexicano.

History 
In December 2019, the C.D. Veracruz was disaffiliated from Liga MX, so initiatives began to emerge to occupy the space left by that club. In May 2020, the Liga de Balompié Mexicano confirmed its fifth founding franchise, named Club Veracruzano de Fútbol Tiburón. On the next day, Diego Bartolotta was named as club president. Finally, on June 14, 2020 Gustavo Matosas was appointed as the club sports president.

On July 11, 2020, Franco Arizala was announced as the first player in the team's history, however, he requested to remain playing until December at Alebrijes de Oaxaca, his team at that time. On August 13, the team announced the signing of Carlos Peña, who played for the Mexico national football team at the 2014 FIFA World Cup.

On September 24, 2020, the team presented its official kit, inspired by the C.D. Veracruz, a team to which the name and colors of this club pay tribute.

On December 1, 2020, the club's franchise was put on hiatus by the LBM due to financial problems and the lack of a new board of directors that can provide financial support to the club. The team could return in the following season if it manages to improve its financial situation and complies with the guidelines of the competition.

Players

First-team squad

References 

Association football clubs established in 2020
Football clubs in Veracruz
2020 establishments in Mexico
Liga de Balompié Mexicano Teams